To invest is to act for the goal of gaining a profitable return.

Invest may also refer to:
 Invest (meteorology), a potential tropical cyclone
 INVEST (mnemonic), a mnemonic for the characteristics of a well-formed user story

See also
Investment (disambiguation)